Jebel Dosha is a sandstone promontory right beside the Nile, on the western river bank between Soleb and Sedeinga in Northern State in Sudan. It features a rock-cut chapel of Thutmose III, similar to the contemporary Temple of Ellesyia as well as several stelae and rock inscriptions of New Kingdom date.

The chapel
The rock-cut chapel, which overlooks the Nile, contains partly lost inscriptions and wall-decoration of Thutmose III. In the back wall of the chapel there are three largely disfigured seated statues.

Rock inscriptions and  stelae

In the early Ramesside period several stelae, mostly commissioned by the Viceroy of Kush Amenemopet, were added. One of the stelae shows Seti I making an offering to the gods Khnum, Satet and Anket; another, done in sunk relief, shows a kneeling Amenemopet offering to a lunar god and to the goddess Satet.
Several groups of striding figures are carved into the jebel rock.

References

Archaeological sites in Sudan
Egyptian temples
Rock-cut architecture
Dosha
History of Nubia